Meeri Saari (16 September 1925 – 1 October 2018) was a Finnish shot putter who competed in the 1952 Summer Olympics.

References

External links
 

1925 births
2018 deaths
Finnish female shot putters
Olympic athletes of Finland
Athletes (track and field) at the 1952 Summer Olympics